Congolese rumba is a popular genre of dance music that originated in the Congo basin during the 1940s, deriving from Cuban son. The style gained popularity throughout Africa during the 1960s and 1970s.

It is known as Lingala in Kenya, Uganda, and Tanzania after the Lingala language of the lyrics in the majority of the songs. In Zambia and Zimbabwe, where Congolese music is also influential, it is still usually referred to as rumba. It is also an individual dance.

In December 2021, Congolese rumba was added to the UNESCO list of intangible cultural heritage.

History
In the 1930s and 1940s, Afro-Cuban son groups, such as Septeto Habanero, Trio Matamoros, and Los Guaracheros de Oriente, were played over Radio Congo Belge in Léopoldville (Kinshasa), gaining widespread popularity in the country during the following decades. Once local bands tried to emulate the sound of Cuban son (incorrectly referred to as "rumba" in Africa, despite being unrelated to Cuban rumba), their music became known as "soukous", a derivative of the French word "secouer" (literally, "to shake"). By the late 1960s, soukous was an established genre in most of Central Africa, and it would also impact the music of West and East Africa.

To Africans, Cuban popular music sounded familiar and Congolese bands started doing Cuban covers, singing the Spanish lyrics phonetically. Eventually, they created original compositions with lyrics in French or Lingala, a lingua franca of the western Congo region. The Cuban horn guajeos were adapted to guitars. The Congolese called this new music "rumba", though it was more based on son. Antoine Kolosoy, also known as Papa Wendo, became the first star of African rumba, touring Europe and North America in the 1940s and 1950s with his regular band, Victoria Bakolo Miziki, or Victoria Kin. Kolosoy was inspired by Paul Kamba's band, Victoria Brazza. Before Kamba, a Martinican man named Jean Réal also formed the band Congo Rumba in Brazzaville.

By the 1950s, big bands had become the preferred format, using acoustic bass guitars, multiple electric guitars, conga drums, maracas, scrapers, flutes, or clarinets, saxophones, and trumpets. Grand Kalle et l'African Jazz (also known as African Jazz), led by Joseph Kabasele Tshamala (Grand Kalle), and OK Jazz, later renamed TPOK Jazz (Tout Puissant Orchestre Kinshasa, meaning "all-powerful Kinshasa band"), led by Franco, became the leading bands. One of the musical innovations of Franco's band was the mi-solo (meaning "half solo") guitarist, playing arpeggio patterns and filling a role between the lead and rhythm guitars.

1960s–1970s

In the 1950s and 1960s, some artists who had performed in the bands of Franco Luambo and Grand Kalle formed their own groups. Tabu Ley Rochereau and Dr. Nico Kasanda formed African Fiesta and transformed their music further by fusing Congolese folk with soul, as well as Caribbean and Latin beats and instrumentation. They were joined by Papa Wemba and Sam Mangwana, and classics like "Afrika Mokili Mobimba" made them one of Africa's most prominent bands. Congolese "rumba" eventually evolved into soukous. Tabu Ley Rochereau and Dr Nico Kasanda are considered the pioneers of modern soukous. Other greats of this period include Koffi Olomide, Tshala Muana, and Wenge Musica.

While the rumba influenced bands such as Lipua-Lipua, Veve, TP OK Jazz, and Bella Bella, younger Congolese musicians looked for ways to reduce that influence and play a faster-paced soukous inspired by rock and roll. A group of students called Zaiko Langa Langa came together in 1969 around founding vocalist Papa Wemba. Pepe Kalle, a protégé of Grand Kalle, created the band Empire Bakuba together with Papy Tex, and they too became popular.

East Africa in the 1970s

Soukous now spread across Africa and became an influence on virtually all the styles of modern African popular music, including highlife, palm-wine music, taarab, and makossa. As political conditions in Zaire, as the Democratic Republic of Congo was known then, deteriorated in the 1970s, some groups made their way to Tanzania and Kenya. By the mid-seventies, several Congolese groups were playing soukous at Kenyan night clubs. The lively cavacha, a dance craze that swept East and Central Africa during the seventies, was popularized through recordings of bands such as Zaiko Langa Langa and Orchestra Shama Shama, influencing Kenyan musicians. This rhythm, played on the snare drum or hi-hat, quickly became a hallmark of the Congolese sound in Nairobi and is frequently used by many regional bands. Several of Nairobi's renowned Swahili rumba bands formed around Tanzanian groups like Simba Wanyika and their offshoots, Les Wanyika and Super Wanyika Stars.

In the late 1970s, Virgin Records produced LPs from the Tanzanian–Congolese Orchestra Makassy and the Kenya-based Super Mazembe. One of the tracks from this album was the Swahili song "Shauri Yako" ("it's your problem"), which became a hit in Kenya, Tanzania, and Uganda. Les Mangelepa was another influential Congolese group that moved to Kenya and became extremely popular throughout East Africa. About this same time, the Nairobi-based Congolese vocalist Samba Mapangala and his band, Orchestra Virunga, released the LP Malako, which became one of the pioneering releases of the newly emerging world music scene in Europe. The musical style of the East Africa-based Congolese bands gradually incorporated new elements, including Kenyan benga music, and spawned what is sometimes called the "Swahili sound" or "Congolese sound".

21st century
In December 2021, Congolese rumba was added to the UNESCO Representative List of the Intangible Cultural Heritage of Humanity.

Musical examples
The following example is from the Congolese rumba "Passi ya boloko" by Franco (Luambo Makiadi) and O.K. Jazz (c. mid-1950s). The bass is playing a tresillo-based tumbao, typical of son montuno. The rhythm guitar plays all of the offbeats, the exact pattern of the rhythm guitar in Cuban son. According to the Garland Encyclopedia of World Music, the lead guitar part "recalls the blue-tinged guitar solos heard in bluegrass and rockabilly music of the 1950s, with its characteristic insistence on the opposition of the major-third and minor-third degrees of the scale."

Banning Eyre distills down the Congolese guitar style to this skeletal figure, where the guide-pattern clave is sounded by the bass notes (notated with downward stems).

In a densely textured seben section of a soukous song (below), the three interlocking guitar parts are reminiscent of the contrapuntal structure of Cuban music, with its layered guajeos.

See also
 Music of the Democratic Republic of the Congo
 Musicians from the Democratic Republic of the Congo

References

Bibliography

External links
 
 The Sound of Sunshine: How soukous saved my life

Democratic Republic of the Congo music
Dance music genres